Aria is the seventeenth album released by Gianna Nannini in 2002. It reached number 7 on the Italian album chart and number 29 on the album chart in Switzerland.

Track listing
"Volo"
"Uomini A Metà"
"Aria"
"DJ Morphine"
"Sveglia"
"Immortale"
"Crimine D'amore"
"Meravigliosamente Crudele"
"Mio"
"Amore Cannibale"
"Battiti E Respiri"
"Un Dio Che Cade"
"Nuova Era"

Personnel 
Gianna Nannini - vocals
Thomas Lang - drums
Production: Armand Volker, Armand Volker & Gianna Nannini (track 3)
Co-production: Christian Lohr
Executive producer: Peter Zumsteg

External links
 Gianna Nannini website

2002 albums
Gianna Nannini albums
Polydor Records albums